There are over 20,000 Grade II* listed buildings in England.  This page is a list of these buildings in the Wyre Forest district in Worcestershire.

Wyre Forest

|}

Notes

References 
English Heritage Images of England

External links

Wyre Forest
 Wyre Forest
Lists of listed buildings in Worcestershire